was a legendary figure in Japanese history, regarded as the founder of sumo wrestling. He was the founder of the Haji no Muraji clan.

Life 

Sukune is said to have lived during the reign of Emperor Suinin (29 BC – 70). Allegedly, in 23 B.C., the Emperor instructed Nomi no Sukune to deal with  after he boasted that he was the strongest man "under the heavens". Nomi no Sukune engaged Taima no Kuyahaya in hand-to-hand combat and broke his ribs with one kick and his back with another, killing Taima no Kehaya. It was not modern sumo, but he is regarded as the creator of sumo.

He was an ancestor of Sugawara no Michizane, great-grandfather to Haji no Mino and was the founder of the Haji clan after his creation of haniwa.

Legacy 
A mural of him, removed from the old National Olympic Stadium in 2014, was put on display at the new stadium in 2019.

References 

People of Yayoi-period Japan
Japanese sumo wrestlers
Japanese jujutsuka
Deified Japanese people

External links 
 Nomi no Sukune - History of Japan Website.

Deified Japanese people in the Kiki